Japanese Lantern is a 1587 lantern sculpture, installed in Boston Public Garden, in Boston, Massachusetts, United States. The lantern was given to the city by Bunkio Matsuki in 1904.

References

1580s sculptures
Boston Public Garden
Outdoor sculptures in Boston